The Riyadh Province, also known as the Riyadh Region, is a region of Saudi Arabia, located in the geographic center of the country. The capital governorate of the province is the Riyadh Governorate and it is named after the capital of the kingdom, Riyadh, which is the most populous city in the region and the kingdom, with a little less than two-thirds of the population of the region residing within the city. The province was governed for nearly five decades by Prince Salman bin Abdulaziz from 1963 to 2011.

Other populous cities in the region include Al Ghat, Zulfi and Majma'ah. Approximately half of the region's area is desert, and it only borders other regions of the kingdom; it has no international borders. The region borders, clockwise from the north, the Eastern Province, Najran Region, 'Asir Region, Mecca Region, Medina Region and the Al-Qassim Region. It is one of the 7 regions of the kingdom that do not have a coastline.

Population 
Population development since 1992:

Subdivisions
In addition to the Municipality of Riyadh, the region is divided into 19 governorates (muhafazat) and 1 sub-governorate (markaz):
 Riyadh
 Layla
 'Afif
 al-Duwadmi
 al-Ghat
 al-Gway'iyyah
 al-Hareeg
 Al Kharj
 Al Majma'ah
 Al-Muzahmiyyah
 al-Sulayyil
 Dhruma
 Dir'iyyah
 Hotat Bani Tamim
 Huraymila
 Rimah
 Shagra
 Thadig
 Wadi ad-Dawasir
 The sub-governorate (markaz) of Marat, which is tied directly to the Municipality of Riyadh.
Yabrin
 Zulfy City

Modern history of Riyadh Province and Saudi Arabia

List of governors

References

External links

  
  
 
 Central Department of Statistics and Information (CDSI), official Saudi census figures from 2004:
 
 

 

Provinces of Saudi Arabia